Peltosaurus is an extinct genus of anguid lizard from North America that lived from the Eocene to the Oligocene. Peltosaurus belongs to the anguid subfamily Glyptosaurinae. The type species Peltosaurus granulosus was named in 1873 by American paleontologist Edward Drinker Cope. Many additional species have been named, but most have been reassigned to different genera. For example, Peltosaurus piger, named in 1928, was reclassified as Odaxosaurus piger, and P. jepseni, named in 1942 from the Paleocene of Wyoming, but was later reclassified as Proxestops jepseni. In 1955 a new species, Peltosaurus macrodon, was named from the Eocene of California. Lizard bones from the Late Miocene of Nebraska were attributed to a new species of Peltosaurus called P. minimus in 1976, extending the fossil range of Peltosaurus and Glyptosaurinae into the Neogene. However, these bones were later referred to a genus of skinks called Eumeces, meaning that the fossil range of Peltosaurus and Glyptosaurinae does not go beyond the Paleogene.

The name Peltosaurus was going to be used for the dinosaur now named Sauropelta, but when it was realized that the name was preoccupied, Sauropelta was substituted.

References

External links
Peltosaurus in the Paleobiology Database
Peltosaurus skull at the Science Museum of Minnesota

Paleogene lizards
Eocene lepidosaurs
Oligocene lepidosaurs
Miocene lepidosaurs
Eocene reptiles of North America
Oligocene genus extinctions
Fossil taxa described in 1873